The Rhode Island Independent Military Organizations (also known as the Chartered Commands of the Rhode Island Militia) are a group of independently-operated chartered militias in the state of Rhode Island, most of whose histories date back to the state's colonial and revolutionary history. Under Rhode Island law, they are considered part of state's organized militia forces but are explicitly distinct from Rhode Island's National Guard, State Guard, and Naval Militia. Today, these organizations are largely ceremonial and educational in purpose but are sometime called up for active civil service in minor capacities.

List of Chartered Organizations

Active 
Artillery Company of Newport
Kentish Guards
Bristol Train of Artillery
Pawtuxet Rangers
Warren Federal Blues
Gloucester Light Infantry
United Train of Artillery
Varnum Continentals
Providence naval battalion

Defunct 
 First Light Infantry of Providence
 Foster Artillery
 Johnston Guards
 Manville Light Infantry
 Narragansett Guards
 National Cadets of Providence
 Providence Horse Guards
 Providence Marine Corps of Artillery
 Rhode Island Guard of Warwick
 Rhode Island Guards No. 3 of Coventry
 Rhode Island Horse Guards
 Rifle Rangers of South Kingstown
 Sea Fencibles of Providence
 Washington Grenadiers
 Wickford Pioneers
 Woonsocket Guards

Sources:

See also 
 Rhode Island National Guard
 Rhode Island State Guard
 List of United States militia units in the American Revolutionary War

References 

Military in Rhode Island
State defense forces of the United States